The 1991 Castilian-Leonese regional election was held on Sunday, 26 May 1991, to elect the 3rd Cortes of the autonomous community of Castile and León. All 84 seats in the Cortes were up for election. The election was held simultaneously with regional elections in twelve other autonomous communities and local elections all throughout Spain.

The preceding legislature had seen José María Aznar forming a minority government of People's Alliance (AP) in 1987 through the abstention of the Democratic and Social Centre (CDS) and the support of the People's Democratic Party (PDP) and the Independent Solution (SI) of Burgos mayor José María Peña San Martín. In May 1989, following AP's re-foundation into the People's Party (PP) earlier that year, the CDS joined the cabinet as a coalition partner, granting the regional government an overall majority in the Cortes. In September 1989, Aznar resigned in order to become the PP's leading candidate for the 29 October general election—and eventually, PP national president in April 1990—, with the regional presidency being granted to Jesús Posada. However, Posada renounced contesting the party's candidacy for re-election in January 1991, following Aznar's decision to pick Juan José Lucas as regional candidate instead.

The election saw the PP secure its first absolute majority in the region, virtually ensuring the election of Lucas to the regional presidency. The CDS, on the other hand, saw its support collapse from 18 to 5 seats, with the PP's majority leaving the party out of government. The opposition Spanish Socialist Workers' Party (PSOE) slightly increased its vote share and seat count compared to its 1987 result, whereas United Left (IU) entered the Cortes for the first time with one seat.

Overview

Electoral system
The Cortes of Castile and León were the devolved, unicameral legislature of the autonomous community of Castile and León, having legislative power in regional matters as defined by the Spanish Constitution and the Castilian-Leonese Statute of Autonomy, as well as the ability to vote confidence in or withdraw it from a regional president.

Voting for the Cortes was on the basis of universal suffrage, which comprised all nationals over 18 years of age, registered in Castile and León and in full enjoyment of their political rights. All members of the Cortes of Castile and León were elected using the D'Hondt method and a closed list proportional representation, with an electoral threshold of three percent of valid votes—which included blank ballots—being applied in each constituency. Seats were allocated to constituencies, corresponding to the provinces of Ávila, Burgos, León, Palencia, Salamanca, Segovia, Soria, Valladolid and Zamora, with each being allocated an initial minimum of three seats, as well as one additional member per each 45,000 inhabitants or fraction greater than 22,500.

The use of the D'Hondt method might result in a higher effective threshold, depending on the district magnitude.

Election date
The term of the Cortes of Castile and León expired four years after the date of their previous election. Legal amendments earlier in 1991 established that elections to the Cortes were to be fixed for the fourth Sunday of May every four years. The previous election was held on 10 June 1987, setting the election date for the Cortes on Sunday, 26 May 1991.

The Cortes of Castile and León could not be dissolved before the date of expiry of parliament except in the event of an investiture process failing to elect a regional president within a two-month period from the first ballot. In such a case, the Cortes were to be automatically dissolved and a snap election called, with elected procurators merely serving out what remained of their four-year terms.

Parliamentary composition
The Cortes of Castile and León were officially dissolved on 2 April 1991, after the publication of the dissolution decree in the Official Gazette of Castile and León. The table below shows the composition of the parliamentary groups in the Cortes at the time of dissolution.

Parties and candidates
The electoral law allowed for parties and federations registered in the interior ministry, coalitions and groupings of electors to present lists of candidates. Parties and federations intending to form a coalition ahead of an election were required to inform the relevant Electoral Commission within ten days of the election call, whereas groupings of electors needed to secure the signature of at least one percent of the electorate in the constituencies for which they sought election, disallowing electors from signing for more than one list of candidates.

Below is a list of the main parties and electoral alliances which contested the election:

Opinion polls
The table below lists voting intention estimates in reverse chronological order, showing the most recent first and using the dates when the survey fieldwork was done, as opposed to the date of publication. Where the fieldwork dates are unknown, the date of publication is given instead. The highest percentage figure in each polling survey is displayed with its background shaded in the leading party's colour. If a tie ensues, this is applied to the figures with the highest percentages. The "Lead" column on the right shows the percentage-point difference between the parties with the highest percentages in a poll. When available, seat projections determined by the polling organisations are displayed below (or in place of) the percentages in a smaller font; 43 seats were required for an absolute majority in the Cortes of Castile and León.

Results

Overall

Distribution by constituency

Aftermath

Notes

References
Opinion poll sources

Other

1991 in Castile and León
Castile and León
Regional elections in Castile and León
May 1991 events in Europe